Brigadier General Ralph "Doc" Parker Eaton (August 5, 1898 − May 16, 1986) was a United States Army officer who served most notably during World War II in the European Theater.

Life
On August 5, 1898, Eaton was born in Bloomington, Illinois, and later went on to attend the prestigious United States Military Academy (USMA) at West Point, New York, graduating in 1924.

Perhaps his most notable role was serving as the Chief of Staff of the 82nd Airborne Division and later XVIII Airborne Corps, both of which were commanded by Major General Matthew Ridgway. His decorations included the Legion of Merit with oak leaf cluster and the Army Distinguished Service Medal. The citation for the medal reads:

His other roles included a War Department Manpower Board Chairman, and Staff Secretary for the Caribbean Command. Fort Bragg, where the 82nd Airborne Division is located, has honored Eaton by naming a Hall after him, Eaton Hall.

Eaton retired from the Army in 1954 and died on May 16, 1986, at the age of 87.  Eaton is interred in Lewis Memorial Park in Asheville, North Carolina.

Career

Eaton's Military Milestones:
 Chief of Staff, 82nd Airborne Division [Italy]
 Chief of Staff, XVIII Airborne Corps [North West Europe]
 Chairman of 7th Section, War Department Manpower Board
 Staff Secretary, Caribbean Command

References

External links
Generals of World War II

1898 births
1986 deaths
Recipients of the Legion of Merit
Recipients of the Distinguished Service Medal (US Army)
United States Military Academy alumni
Military personnel from Illinois
United States Army personnel of World War I
United States Army generals of World War II
United States Army generals